Danger Mouse may refer (or appear in) to:

 Danger Mouse (1981 TV series), a 1981 British animated television series
 Danger Mouse (2015 TV series), a 2015 reboot of the British animated television series
 Danger Mouse (musician) (born 1977), American musician, DJ and producer
 DangerMouse, the nickname of David Morgan-Mar, an Australian physicist and webcomic creator